{{DISPLAYTITLE:C12H14CaO12}}
The molecular formula C12H14CaO12 (molar mass: 390.310 g/mol, exact mass: 390.0111 u) may refer to:

 Calcium ascorbate
 Calcium erythorbate

Molecular formulas